Dan Gutman (born October 19, 1955) is an American writer, primarily of children's fiction.

His works include the Baseball Card Adventures children's book series that began with Honus & Me, and the My Weird School series.

Early life and education
Gutman was born in New York City, moving with his family a year later to Newark, New Jersey, where on June 1, 1968, his father abandoned the family. His homemaker mother Adeline became a secretary and cared for Dan and his older sister, Lucy. After Vailsburg High School in Newark, Gutman graduated from Rutgers University with a degree in psychology in 1977. He began a graduate program in psychology, but dropped out and moved to New York City in 1980 to pursue a writing career.

Career
After moving to New York City, Gutman worked as a magazine editor and columnist. He became the first employee of Video Game Player (later Computer Games) in 1982. He said, "I started a magazine about video games and suddenly I was an expert in video games. I started writing about them and computers. All for grownups. It took me a long time to realize that writing for grownups was not my thing. It took me a long time to realize that what I was good at was writing for kids." His column appeared regularly in various computer-related magazines, such as Genie Livewire.

Works
Gutman has written over 70 books in the My Weird School series illustrated by Jim Paillot, plus related series including My Weird School Daze and My Weirder School. He has also written the Million Dollar series, featuring children who get a chance to win a million dollars in various sporting events; the Genius Files series; Tales from the Sandlot, a series of fantasy sports stories; and the Funny Boy series about an alien boy exiled to Earth. There have also been two about Judson Moon, who became President of the United States at 12; two about Qwerty Stevens and his time machine; and two about children who use a machine to do their homework. His standalone novels include They Came from Center Field, about extraterrestrials who want to learn baseball, Johnny Hangtime, about a young movie stuntman, and Race for the Sky, a historical novel in diary form about the Wright brothers.

Gutman's Baseball Card Adventures series, illustrated by Steve Chorney, revolves around a child named Joe Stoshack who travels back in time to meet baseball legends. The first work is based on the premise of his finding a Honus Wagner T206 baseball card in the attic of his neighbor. Further books in the series feature Jackie Robinson, Babe Ruth, Shoeless Joe Jackson, Dorothy Maguire, Abner Doubleday, Satchel Paige, Jim Thorpe, Ray Chapman, Roberto Clemente, Ted Williams, and Willie Mays. The original story, Honus & Me, was made into the Turner Network Television TV-movie The Winning Season, starring Matthew Modine and Kristin Davis.

Gutman's 1996 novel The Kid Who Ran for President was compared to the Donald Trump's 2016 presidential campaign by comedian John Oliver during an August 2016 segment of the show Last Week Tonight with John Oliver. As a result, the book jumped in sales.

Gutman wrote The Genius Files series. The 5-book series followed twins Coke and Pepsi (Pep) McDonald on a cross-country road trip to their aunt's wedding in Washington D.C. In book 3, You Only Die Twice, the family's RV explodes and for the remainder of the series the family drives in a Ferrari.

Personal life
Gutman met his future wife, Nina Wallace, an illustrator, when she did freelance work for Computer Games. They married in 1983. They have lived in Haddonfield, New Jersey, and New York City, and have two children, Sam and Emma.

Selected bibliography
Flashback Four series (2016-2019)
"The Lincoln Project" (2016)
"The Titanic Mission" (2017) 
"The Pompeii Disaster" (2018)
"The Hamilton-Burr Duel" (2019)

The Kid (1996-1999)
The Kid Who Ran for President (1996)
The Kid Who Became President (1999)

Baseball Card Adventures (1997–2015)
Honus and Me (1997)

Million Dollar (1997-2006)
The Million Dollar Shot (1997)
The Million Dollar Kick (2001)
The Million Dollar Goal (2003)
The Million Dollar Strike (2004)
The Million Dollar Putt (2006)

My Weird School (2001-2008)

My Weird School Daze (2008-2011)

My Weirder School (2011-2014)

My Weird School Special (2013–present)

My Weirdest School (2015-2018)

My Weird School: I Can Read (2016-2018)

My Weird School Fast Facts (2016-2019)

My Weirder-est School (2019–present)

Qwerty Stevens books (2002-2005)
The Edison Mystery (2002)
Stuck in Time with Benjamin Franklin (2005)

The Genius Files (2011-2015)
 The Genius Files: Mission Unstoppable
 The Genius Files: Never Say Genius
 The Genius Files: You Only Die Twice
 The Genius Files: From Texas with Love
 The Genius Files: License to Thrill

References

External links

 
  Interview at BookReviewsAndMore.ca
 
 

American children's writers
Baseball writers
Rutgers University alumni
Writers from New York City
People from Haddonfield, New Jersey
1955 births
Living people
American male novelists